Émilien Néron (born December 28, 1998) is a Canadian actor from Longueuil, Quebec. He is most noted for his performance as Simon in the 2011 film Monsieur Lazhar, for which he won the Jutra Award for Best Supporting Actor at the 14th Jutra Awards in 2012.

He has also appeared in the films The Canadiens, Forever (Pour toujours, les Canadiens!) and Midsummer's Dream, and the television series Tactik, Les Parent, 30 vies, 19-2 and Karl & Max: Été 84. He also voiced the lead role of Norman in the French dubbed version of ParaNorman.

References

External links

1998 births
21st-century Canadian male actors
Canadian male child actors
Canadian male film actors
Canadian male television actors
Canadian male voice actors
French Quebecers
Male actors from Quebec
People from Longueuil
Living people
Best Supporting Actor Jutra and Iris Award winners